This is a list of bridges in Pakistan.

Bridges of historical and architectural interest

Major bridges

Alphabetical list 
This is a list of road flyovers, road overpasses, road and railway bridges in Pakistan.

 Abdullahpur Flyover, road flyover, overpass, Faisalabad, Punjab
 Abdullah Gul Interchange, road flyover, Lahore, Punjab
 Attock Bridge, road and railway bridge, Indus River
 Ayub Bridge, railway bridge, Sukkur
 Aziz Cross/Rawalpindi Bypass Chowk Flyover, Gujranwala, Punjab (proposed)
 Chandni Chowk Flyover, road flyover, Rawalpindi, Punjab
 Chenab Bridge, G.T Road Gujrat, Punjab
 Chiniot Bridge, road bridge, Chiniot, Punjab
 Chund Bridge, road and railway bridge, Jhang, Punjab
 Harbanspura Interchange, road flyover, Lahore, Punjab
 Chowk Kumharanwala Level II Flyover/Jinnah Chowk Flyover, Multan, Punjab
 Earthquake Memorial Bridge, road bridge, Muzaffarabad, Azad Kashmir
 Gujrat Flyover, G.T Road/Bypass Road intersection, Gujrat, Punjab
 Gomal Bridge, 
 Jhelum Bridge, road bridge, G.t Road, Jhelum, Punjab
 Jinnah Bridge, road bridge, Karachi, Sindh,
 Kak Pul, road bridge, Islamabad
 Kalma Chowk Flyover, road flyover, overpass, Lahore, Punjab
 Kangniwala Flover, Sialkot Bypass/Eastern Bypass, Gujranwala, Punjab
 Kachehrti Chowk and Chungi No 7 & 8 Flyover, Multan, Punjab
 Khiali Flyover, Bypass road Gujranwala, Punjab
 Khushalgarh bridge, opened in 1907, on river Indus, it is a dual purpose bridge.
 Kohala Bridge, road bridge, Kohala
 Kotri Bridge, road and railway bridge, Hyderabad
 Lansdowne Bridge Rohri, railway bridge, Sukkur
 Lasbela Bridge, road bridge, Karachi, Sindh
 Malir River Bridge, road bridge, Karachi, Sindh
 Muslim Town Flyover, road flyover, overpass, Lahore, Punjab
 Nala Ankar Bridge, Saghar Talagang, Chakwal, Punjab
 Nala Ankar Bridge, in Talagang, Punjab, Pakistan
 Napier Mole Bridge, in Karachi, Sindh
 Native Jetty Bridge, in Karachi, Sindh
 Nishtar Chowk Flyover, Multan, Punjab
 Pul Moj Darya Flyover/Kalma Chowk Flyover, Multan, Punjab
 Saggian Interchange, road flyover, overpass, Lahore, Punjab
 Shaheen Chowk Flyover, Bypass road, Gujrat, Punjab (proposed)
 Sher Shah Interchange Flyover, Multan, Punjab
 T-Shape Flyover, G.T Road/Sialkot Road. Gujranwala, Punjab
 Youyi Bridge, road bridge, Thakot
 Yousuf Raza Gillani Flyover, Multan, Punjab
 Zero Point Interchange, road overpass, Islamabad

Notes and References 
 Notes

 

 Others references

See also 

 Transport in Pakistan
 History of rail transport in Pakistan
 Motorways of Pakistan
 National Highways of Pakistan
 List of rivers of Pakistan
 List of dams and reservoirs in Pakistan
 List of barrages and headworks in Pakistan

External links

Further reading 
 

Pakistan
 
Bridges
Bridges
Bridges